General elections were held in Grenada on 10 October 1951. They were the first held with universal suffrage. Eric Gairy's Grenada Mental and Manual Workers Union won six of the eight seats. However, at this time the Legislative Council had few powers and the role of head of government remained with the Administrator.

Results

References

1951 in Grenada
Elections in Grenada
Grenada
British Windward Islands
October 1951 events in North America